Åseda is a locality and the seat of Uppvidinge Municipality, Kronoberg County, Sweden with 2,430 inhabitants in 2010.

Åseda was the birthplace of the chemist Otto Folin (1867–1934), and of the motorcycle speedway rider Peter Ljung (born 1982).

See also
Åseda Glasbruk

References 

Populated places in Kronoberg County
Populated places in Uppvidinge Municipality
Municipal seats of Kronoberg County
Swedish municipal seats
Värend